Storflaket is a permafrost plateau peat bog on the southern shore of Torneträsk lake, in northern Sweden. Storflaket together with Stordalen is one of the main sites of studying palsas and methane emissions in Scandinavia. The bog received its name, Storflaket, due to its relatively large extent and flat surface during the buildings works of Malmbanan railroad in early 20th century.

See also
Abisko Scientific Research Station
Stordalen

Kiruna
Bogs of Sweden
Palsas
Patterned grounds
Landforms of Norrbotten County